Ladislav Kamenický (born 4 October 1970 ) is an MP of the National Council of Slovakia for Direction – Slovak Social Democracy (Smer-SD). He served as the Minister of Finance for little over a year between 2019 and 2020.

Ladislav Kamenický graduated from the University of Economics in Bratislava. In 2012 he became an MP of the National Council of Slovakia. As an MP, is seen as polite and staunchly loyal to the leadership of Smer-SD's Chairman and Kamenický's personal friend Robert Fico . In 2019 he became the Minister of Finance, filling the seat emptied after the previous minister Peter Kažimír became the Central Bank Governor. The choice of Kamenický was seen as a compromise between various factions of Smer-SD. After the defeat of SMER-SD in the 2020 Slovak parliamentary election, Kamenický returned to the parliament.

Kamenický is an art connoisseur.

References

Living people
1970 births
Finance ministers of Slovakia
Members of the National Council (Slovakia) 2012-2016
Members of the National Council (Slovakia) 2016-2020
Members of the National Council (Slovakia) 2020-present
Direction – Social Democracy politicians
Prime Ministers of Slovakia
University of Economics in Bratislava alumni